Ramulus pseudoporus is the type species of the genus Ramulus: a phasmid or stick insect. It is found in Sri Lanka.

References

Phasmatidae
Insects of Sri Lanka
Endemic fauna of Sri Lanka
Insects described in 1859
Taxa named by John O. Westwood